Baron Upper Ossory was a title in the Peerage of Ireland. It was created on 11 June 1541 for Barnaby Fitzpatrick. This was in pursuance of the Surrender and regrant policy of King Henry VIII. Under the policy, Gaelic chiefs were actively encouraged to surrender their lands to the king and then have them regranted (returned) under a royal charter if they swore loyalty to him. Those who surrendered were also expected to speak English, wear English-style dress, remain loyal to the Crown, pay a rent and follow English laws and customs, abjure the Roman Catholic Church, and convert to Henry's new Anglican Church.

The second Baron, also named Barnaby, was raised at Henry's court, as a companion for the future King Edward VI. Edward, who had few friends, became deeply attached to young Barnaby, and their later letters testify to their warm and lasting friendship.

Upper Ossory was the northern third of the formerly larger Kingdom of Osraige.

Barons Upper Ossory; First creation (1541)
 Barnaby Fitzpatrick, 1st Baron Upper Ossory (born ) (–1575)
 Barnaby Fitzpatrick, 2nd Baron Upper Ossory (–1581)
 Florence Fitzpatrick, 3rd Baron Upper Ossory (died 1613)
 Thady or Teige Fitzpatrick, 4th Baron Upper Ossory (died 1627), who married Joan Butler, the daughter of Sir Edmund Butler of Cloughgrenan
Barnaby Fitzpatrick, 5th Baron Upper Ossory (died )
Barnaby Fitzpatrick, 6th Baron Upper Ossory (died )
Barnaby Fitzpatrick, 7th Baron Upper Ossory (died 1696). On 11 May 1691, the seventh baron was attainted and the barony forfeited.

Barons Upper Ossory; Second creation (1794)
The title was re-created on 9 August 1794 for the second Earl of Upper Ossory. On his death in 1818, both titles became extinct.
John FitzPatrick, 2nd Earl of Upper Ossory (1745–1818) (extinct)

See also
Baron Castletown
Baron Gowran
Earl of Upper Ossory
Kingdom of Ossory

References

Morris, Christopher  The Tudors  Fontana edition 1966

External links
Fitzpatrick - Mac Giolla Phádraig Clan Society
 Fitzpatrick Arms, Crests, Mottos and Supporters by Ronan Fitzpatrick
 Descendants of Bryan Fitzpatrick, Lord and First Baron of Upper Ossory

Extinct baronies in the Peerage of Great Britain
FitzPatrick dynasty
1541 establishments in Ireland
Noble titles created in 1541
Noble titles created in 1794
Forfeited baronies in the Peerage of Ireland
Gaelic nobility of Ireland